Mercer is a town in Somerset County, Maine, United States. The town was named after Revolutionary War hero Brigadier General Hugh Mercer. The population was 709 at the 2020 census.

Geography

Demographics

2010 census
As of the census of 2010, there were 664 people, 287 households, and 199 families living in the town. The racial makeup of the town was 98.3% White, 0.2% African American, 0.6% Native American, 0.5% Asian, and 0.5% from two or more races. Hispanic or Latino of any race were 0.3% of the population.

There were 287 households, of which 22.3% had children under the age of 18 living with them, 57.1% were married couples living together, 8.7% had a female householder with no husband present, 3.5% had a male householder with no wife present, and 30.7% were non-families. 24.0% of all households were made up of individuals, and 8.3% had someone living alone who was 65 years of age or older. The average household size was 2.31 and the average family size was 2.69.

The median age in the town was 48.4 years. 18.1% of residents were under the age of 18; 6.1% were between the ages of 18 and 24; 19.8% were from 25 to 44; 40.1% were from 45 to 64; and 16.1% were 65 years of age or older. The gender makeup of the town was 48.9% male and 51.1% female.

2000 census
As of the census of 2000, there were 647 people, 256 households, and 178 families living in the town.  The population density was 24.2 people per square mile (9.4/km).  There were 366 housing units at an average density of 13.7 per square mile (5.3/km).  The racial makeup of the town was 97.06% White, 0.15% African American, 0.31% Native American, 1.39% Asian, 0.62% from other races, and 0.46% from two or more races. Hispanic or Latino of any race were 0.62% of the population.

There were 256 households, out of which 31.6% had children under the age of 18 living with them, 59.4% were married couples living together, 5.9% had a female householder with no husband present, and 30.1% were non-families. 19.9% of all households were made up of individuals, and 9.0% had someone living alone who was 65 years of age or older.  The average household size was 2.53 and the average family size was 2.94.

In the town, the population was spread out, with 24.3% under the age of 18, 6.6% from 18 to 24, 26.0% from 25 to 44, 30.8% from 45 to 64, and 12.4% who were 65 years of age or older.  The median age was 42 years. For every 100 females, there were 91.4 males.  For every 100 females age 18 and over, there were 97.6 males.

The median income for a household in the town was $37,500, and the median income for a family was $41,250. Males had a median income of $34,028 versus $21,295 for females. The per capita income for the town was $18,068.  About 7.2% of families and 12.6% of the population were below the poverty line, including 12.1% of those under age 18 and 15.1% of those age 65 or over.

Notable people 

 Frank Munsey, newspaper and magazine publisher, author

References

Towns in Somerset County, Maine
Towns in Maine